Queer Visitors from the Marvelous Land of Oz was a newspaper comic strip written by L. Frank Baum and illustrated by Walt McDougall, a political cartoonist for the Philadelphia North American. Queer Visitors appeared in the North American, the Chicago Record-Herald and other newspapers from 28 August 1904 to 26 February 1905. The series chronicles the misadventures of the Scarecrow, the Tin Woodman, the Woggle-Bug, Jack Pumpkinhead, and the Sawhorse, as the Gump flies them to various cities in the United States. The comic strip in turn produced its own derivation, The Woggle-Bug Book (1905).

Queer Visitors was formatted as a series of prose stories, surrounded by large illustrations, therefore not a comic strip in the modern sense.

Development
The project was designed to promote The Marvelous Land of Oz. Coincidentally, it ran at the same time as a comic strip featuring Oz characters visiting America, that was written and drawn by W. W. Denslow. Denslow drew the illustrations for The Wonderful Wizard of Oz and shared in its copyright. After Baum and Denslow had a falling out, Denslow exercised his copyright through his strip, called Denslow's Scarecrow and Tin-Man, which ran in relatively few newspapers from December 1904 to March 1905—an artistic and commercial failure.

Re-publication
The Visitors from Oz, published by Reilly and Lee in 1960, includes about half of Baum's Visitors stories rewritten and illustrated by Dick Martin.

The 27 Queer Visitors stories have been republished in book form as The Third Book of Oz (1989) from Buckethead Enterprises, which was censored. The Buckethead Edition was a reprint under a new cover of an earlier edition, and Dulabone was not aware at the time that it was censored. The Third Book of Oz also includes another early promotion project, "The Woggle-Bug Book" (written by Baum and illustrated by Ike Morgan); the volume is illustrated by Eric Shanower. Hungry Tiger Press corrected the censoring from the Buckethead edition but used The Visitors from Oz as the title, like the 1960 adaptation.

In June, 2009, Sunday Press Books released a collected edition of the newspaper strips in their original format and coloring. The book also included W. W. Denslow's competing strip Denslow's Scarecrow And Tin-Man as well as other comic strips by Walt McDougall, W. W. Denslow, and John R. Neill.

References

Comics based on Oz (franchise)
1904 comics debuts
1905 comics endings
American comic strips
Fantasy comics
Works by L. Frank Baum